Football Club de Saint-Louis Neuweg is a French association football club founded in 1990. It is based in the town of Saint-Louis, Haut-Rhin and its home stadium is the Stade de la Frontière. As of the 2022–23 season, it plays in the sixth tier of French football.

Current squad

References

External links
  

Saint Louis Neuweg
Football clubs in Grand Est
1990 establishments in France
Sport in Haut-Rhin